Westminster Abbey was a constituency in the Parliament of the United Kingdom. It returned one Member of Parliament (MP) to the House of Commons by the first past the post system of election.

It was created for the 1918 general election, and included all of the former Westminster constituency, as reduced in area in 1885, apart from its Knightsbridge exclave, plus all of the former Strand constituency. It continued to exist until the 1950 general election, when it was merged with the two-seat City of London constituency to form a single-member seat named Cities of London and Westminster.

The seat was sometimes known as the Abbey Division of Westminster or simply Abbey. It was held by the Conservative Party for its entire existence.

Boundaries

The City of Westminster is a district of Inner London. Its southern boundary is on the north bank of the River Thames. In 1918 it was to the west of the City of London, to the south of Holborn and St. Pancras and to the east of Kensington and Chelsea. It consisted of the eastern part of the Metropolitan Borough of Westminster, comprising the then wards of Covent Garden, Great Marlborough, Pall Mall, Regent, St. Anne, St. John, St. Margaret, Strand and part of Charing Cross.

History
The constituency was created in 1918 from the former seats of Westminster & Strand. From 1918 to 1950, it returned five Conservative MPs, with Labour and the Liberals having little support in the area.

After William Burdett-Coutts, the first MP for the seat, died in 1921 there was a by-election where all three candidates claimed to be anti-waste. At the time the Anti-Waste League was active. It was formed to advance the political ambitions of the newspaper owner Lord Rothermere. The objects of the League were to insist upon measures being taken to restore the country to solvency, urge a wholesale reduction of expenditure, fight the battle of local rates and oppose sham Anti-Waste candidates. The Conservative candidate John Nicholson won the election, but the Anti-Waste League (whose candidate later became a Conservative MP) polled respectably and the Liberal candidate (a former MP) came third.

After Nicholson's death in 1924 a further by-election took place. The new Conservative candidate Otho Nicholson was challenged by the prominent politician Winston Churchill as a Constitutionalist, the formidable Labour stalwart and future MP Fenner Brockway, and a little-known Liberal. The Constitutionalist label was one used by a number of candidates, mostly ex-Liberals like Churchill, in the 1920s. The Constitutionalists did not function as a party and most of them ended up joining the Liberal or Conservative Parties. Nicholson beat Churchill with a very small majority of 43.

By the 1945 general election, the electorate of the area had dropped by almost half since the pre-war by-election. Labour almost equalled the 27% vote Brockway had received in 1924. The Independent Progressive candidate of 1939 reappeared as a Communist candidate and received 17.6% of the vote. The Conservatives still had an absolute majority of the vote. For the 1950 general election, the seat became the central part of the new constituency of Cities of London and Westminster.

Members of Parliament

Elections

1910s

1920s

1930s

1940s

Notes

References
 
 Boundaries of Parliamentary Constituencies 1885-1972, compiled and edited by F. W. S. Craig (Political Reference Publications 1972)
 Who's Who of British Members of Parliament: Volume III 1919-1945, edited by M. Stenton and S. Lees (The Harvester Press 1976)
 British Parliamentary Election Results 1918-1949, compiled and edited by F.W.S. Craig (The Macmillan Press 1979)
 Minor Parties at British Parliamentary Elections 1885-1974, compiled and edited by F.W.S. Craig (The Macmillan Press 1975)

Parliamentary constituencies in London (historic)
Politics of the City of Westminster
Constituencies of the Parliament of the United Kingdom established in 1918
Constituencies of the Parliament of the United Kingdom disestablished in 1950
20th century in London